The Polish Kennel Club, a member of the FCI, is an organization responsible for dog pedigree registration services in Poland. The organization also provides training services, judging for conformation shows, and many other services relating to dog showing.

References

External links
Official Website of the Polish Kennel Club

Fédération Cynologique Internationale
Kennel clubs
Organizations established in 1938
Organisations based in Warsaw